Francis and the Lights is an American pop project led by Francis Farewell Starlite. The term "and the Lights" refers both to the lights on a stage and pixels on a computer screen.

Starlite often uses the Francis and the Lights name when crediting his solo work and contributions. He has said, "There are no 'members' of Francis and the Lights. It is me and whomever else is involved. Including you."

Their music is characterized by a heavy use of electronically produced beats. During live performances, the vocals are backed by his pre-produced tracks with the assistance of a DJ, while Francis uses a synthesizer at times. Past performances have included a live band, as depicted in several of their earlier music videos. Francis and the Lights released their debut studio album, Farewell, Starlite!, on September 24, 2016.

History
In 2007, Francis and the Lights self-released their debut EP, Striking. Their second EP, A Modern Promise, came out in August 2008. Francis and the Lights was credited as producing the song "Karaoke" for Canadian rapper Drake from his 2010 debut album Thank Me Later. In 2010, they toured with Drake, MGMT, Ke$ha, La Roux, and Mark Ronson. On July 20, 2010, Francis and the Lights released their third EP, It'll Be Better, through Cantora Records. It was produced by Francis Farewell Starlite and Jake Schreier. Schreier, once a supporting musician for Francis and the Lights, has directed most of their music videos, and they provided the score for his feature film debut, Robot & Frank (2012). A fourth EP, Like a Dream, came out in 2013. Drake quoted the 2010 Francis and the Lights song "Get in the Car" on the track "Madonna" from his 2015 mixtape If You're Reading This It's Too Late. The phrase "Big as Madonna" was later used on a shirt that was worn by Madonna during her infamous appearance in Drake's 2015 Coachella Valley Music and Arts Festival headlining set.

In 2016, Francis and the Lights were featured on Chance the Rapper's "Summer Friends"  from his third mixtape, Coloring Book. They served as the opening act on the North American tour dates of Chance the Rapper's Magnificent Coloring World Tour, which ran between September 2016 and October 2016. On May 15, 2016, Starlite released a solo piano song entitled "Thank You", which was recorded on a phone in Justin Vernon's living room. On July 7, 2016, Francis and the Lights released a music video for the new song "Friends" featuring Bon Iver and Kanye West. On August 13, 2016, the band premiered their debut studio album Farewell, Starlite! during their performance at the Eaux Claires music festival. It was released on September 24, 2016 after a performance of the album at Chance the Rapper's Magnificent Coloring Day festival. In 2016, Francis and the Lights performed a cover of "Dear Theodosia" as a duet with Chance the Rapper on The Hamilton Mixtape. A remix of "May I Have This Dance" featuring Chance the Rapper was released alongside a music video on May 18, 2017. Just for Us, their sophomore album, was released in December 2017.

Francis and the Lights are credited as a producer on the 2018 Kanye West album ye for the tracks "I Thought About Killing You," "All Mine," and "Ghost Town." They appear uncredited on the song "I Thought About Killing You," co-written by Starlite, on a loop heard throughout the track. On Kids See Ghosts, a collaboration by West and Kid Cudi under the name Kids See Ghosts, they are also credited as a producer on "Feel the Love," which features rapper Pusha T.

Their third album, Same Night Different Dream, was originally announced for release as Take Me to the Light via a Tumblr post in August 2019. It was subsequently renamed and scheduled for a November 1 release that was eventually delayed. "Take Me to the Light" featuring Bon Iver and Kanye West, was released as its first single on August 30, 2019.

Discography

Studio albums
Farewell, Starlite! (2016)
Just for Us (2017)

EPs
Striking (2007)
A Modern Promise (2008)
It'll Be Better (2010)
Like a Dream (2013)

Soundtracks
Robot & Frank (2012)
 Always Be My Maybe (2019)

Singles
"LIME/WYN" (2008)
"Eiffel Tower" / "The Things That I Would Do" (with inc.) (2011)
"Friends" (featuring Bon Iver and Kanye West) (2016)
"See Her Out (That's Just Life)" (2016)
"May I Have This Dance" (remix featuring Chance the Rapper) (2017) [US Billboard Alternative Songs Chart No. 36]
"Scream so Loud (Lammer Dance Mix)" (2018)
"Try Tho We Might To" (2018)
"The Video in the Pool" (2018)
"Do u Need Love?" (2019)
"Take Me to the Light" (featuring Bon Iver and Kanye West) (2019)
"For Days (Sike)" (with Spencer Sike) (2021)

Compilation appearances
"Can't Tell Me Nothing" (cover of Kanye West's "Can't Tell Me Nothing"), Guilt by Association Vol. 2 (2008)
"Dear Theodosia" (with Chance the Rapper, The Hamilton Mixtape) (2016)

Featured appearances
"Karaoke" (Drake, Thank Me Later) (2010)
"Something Better" (Lyrics Born, As U Were) (2010)
"Celebration" (Das Racist, Relax) (2011)
 "Chameleon/Comedian" (Kathleen Edwards, Voyageur) (2012)
"Wonderful Everyday: Arthur" (Chance the Rapper with The Social Experiment) (2014)
Surf (Nico Segal & The Social Experiment) (2015)
"Summer Friends" (Chance the Rapper featuring Jeremih) (2016)
"Wild Love" (Cashmere Cat featuring The Weeknd, 9) (2016)
"IT'S ALRITE 2 CRY" (Kool A.D. featuring Francis Farewell Starlite, HAVE A NICE DREAM) (2016)
Merry Christmas Lil' Mama (Jeremih and Chance the Rapper) (2016)
ye (Kanye West) (2018)
"Feel the Love" (Kids See Ghosts featuring Pusha T, Kids See Ghosts) (2018)
"Just for Us, Pt. 2" (Benny Blanco, Friends Keep Secrets) (2018)
"Forgiven" (2 Chainz featuring Marsha Ambrosius, Rap or Go to the League) (2019)
Intellexual (Intellexual) (2019)
"Look What You're Doing to Me" (Banks, III) (2019)
"To Someone Else" (Kacy Hill) (2019)
The Big Day (Chance the Rapper) (2019)
"I CRY 3" (93PUNX, 93PUNX) (2019)
"For Your Eyes Only" (Cashmere Cat, Princess Catgirl) (2019)
"Selah" (Kanye West, Jesus Is King) (2019)
"I Believe in You" (Kacy Hill, Is It Selfish If We Talk About Me Again) (2020)

References

External links
 Francis and the Lights official website

Musical groups from Oakland, California
Musical groups established in 2007